Gerrish Township is a civil township of Roscommon County in the U.S. state of Michigan. The population was 2,993 at the 2010 census.

Communities

Geography

Gerrish Township has a long coastline and mostly surrounds Higgins Lake and the much smaller Marl Lake, as well as most of the boundaries of South Higgins Lake State Park.  The Cut River begins at Higgins Lake within Gerrish Township and flows south through Markey Township to Houghton Lake.

History
The location started as the Gerrish Logging Camp. On April 5, 1880, at the camp, area residents met and elected officers for their newly formed township. The first Township Supervisor was James Watson (1880, 1883-1889). The longest serving Township Supervisor was Wiley E. Sims (1901-1905, 1921-1928). As originally platted, the township included present-day Gerrish, Lyon, and Markey townships. In 1920, the boundary line was reestablished to its present lines. The second permanent town hall was built in 1970.

Demographics
As of the census of 2000, there were 3,072 people, 1,343 households, and 957 families residing in the township. The racial makeup of the township was 98.24% White, 0.33% African American, 0.29% Native American, 0.16% Asian, 0.10% Pacific Islander, 0.16% from other races, and 0.72% from two or more races. Hispanic or Latino of any race were 0.62% of the population.

There were 1,343 households, out of which 22.7% had children under the age of 18 living with them, 63.7% were married couples living together, 5.4% had a female householder with no husband present, and 28.7% were non-families. 25.4% of all households were made up of individuals, and 12.6% had someone living alone who was 65 years of age or older.  The average household size was 2.29 and the average family size was 2.71.

In the township the population was spread out, with 20.0% under the age of 18, 4.8% from 18 to 24, 19.7% from 25 to 44, 31.0% from 45 to 64, and 24.4% who were 65 years of age or older.  The median age was 48 years. For every 100 females, there were 99.5 males.  For every 100 females age 18 and over, there were 97.4 males.

The median income for a household in the township was $37,147, and the median income for a family was $46,469. Males had a median income of $41,542 versus $23,500 for females. The per capita income for the township was $19,877.  About 5.1% of families and 6.8% of the population were below the poverty line, including 8.5% of those under age 18 and 5.4% of those age 65 or over.

References

External links
Gerrish Township home page
Higgins Lake/Roscommon Chamber of Commerce

Townships in Roscommon County, Michigan
Townships in Michigan
1880 establishments in Michigan
Populated places established in 1880